Naomi Broady and Heather Watson were the defending champions, however Watson chose not to participate, while Broady chose to compete at the 2018 Kurume U.S.E Cup.

Jessica Moore and Galina Voskoboeva won the title after defeating Xenia Knoll and Anna Smith 0–6, 6–3, [10–7] in the final.

Seeds

Draw

Draw

References
Main Draw

Empire Slovak Open - Doubles